Alonso S. Perales (October 17, 1898  May 9, 1960) was a Mexican American lawyer, diplomat, and civil rights activist based in Texas. He was a founder of the League of United Latin American Citizens (LULAC) and served as the second president, helping write its constitution. Perales also served as a diplomat in the Eisenhower administration.

Early life 

Perales was born on October 17, 1898  in Alice, Texas to Susana (née Sandoval) and Nicolás Perales. At the age of 6, he was orphaned. He worked as a child and later married local bookstore owner, Marta Pérez. Together, they adopted a daughter and two sons.

He went to the public schools in Alice and then continued his education at Draughn's Practical Business College in Corpus Christi, Texas.

When World War I broke out, Perales was drafted into the United States Army as a Field Army Clerk. After serving, he received an honorary discharge in 1920. He then took and passed the civil service examination and moved to Washington D.C. It is possible that during this time he worked for the Department of Commerce for about a year and a half. While in Washington D.C., he continued his studies, receiving a Bachelor's of Arts degree from National University's School of Economics and Government. He received his law degree from what would become the George Washington University Law School in 1925. He returned to Texas shortly afterward as one of the first Mexican Americans to practice law in the United States.

Career

Diplomacy 
In the 1920s through the 1930s, Perales served as a diplomat, traveling to the Dominican Republic, Cuba, Nicaragua, Mexico, Chile, and the West Indies on various diplomatic missions. Later, in 1945, he served as legal counsel to the Nicaraguan delegation at the United Nations Conference on International Organization (UNCIO), also known as the San Francisco Conference. This conference took place from 25 April 1945 to 26 June 1945 in San Francisco, California. During this meeting, delegates reviewed the 1944  Dumbarton Oaks agreements and created the Charter of the United Nations.

Civil rights 
Perales was active in civil rights advocacy and according to scholars, is one of the most influential Mexican Americans of his time. He moved to back to Texas and dedicated his life to combatting discrimination of people of Mexican descent through law, advocacy, and his writings, including two volumes of En Defensa de mi raza (In Defense of My People), first published in 1937. These volumes included essays, letters, speeches, and work by other intellectuals on the problem of discrimination in Texas. His book, Are We Good Neighbors?, published in 1948 by Artes Gráficas, examined the discrimination, exploitation, and injustices faced by people of Mexican and Latin American descent throughout the United States. Are We Good Neighbors? also includes affidavits from the public that detail these incidents of discrimination.

In San Antonio, Texas, Perales collaborated with Maury Maverick. And in the 1940s, he petitioned to introduce a bill in the Texas legislature that would prohibit discrimination based on race.

LULAC 
During the 1930s, Mexican Americans, as well as other communities of Latin American descent, began organizing in response to Juan Crow, or José Cuervo, laws in Texas. This resulted in the formation of  Order of the Sons of America (El Orden Hijos de América) and the Order of the Knights of America (El Orden Caballeros de América), Mexican American organizations with various statewide chapters. Between 1927-1928, Perales and Ben Garza, leader of the Order of the Sons of America Council #4 in Corpus Christi, discussed how to merge these organizations.

In 1929, these organizations, along with the League of Latin American Citizens (headed by Perales), decided to merge to form the League of United Latin American Citizens (LULAC). Perales, thus, joined  Garza, Manuel C. Gonzales, Andres de Luna, Louis Wilmot, Rafael Galvan Sr., Juan Galván, Vicente Lozano, José Tomás Canales, Edwardo Idar, Mauro Machado, J. Luz Saenz, Juan C. Solis, and E.H. Marin to found what would become the oldest Hispanic civil rights organization in the country, LULAC. Perales, with the help of Canales and Idar, drafted the LULAC constitution.

Perales went on to form LULAC Council 16 in San Antonio, Texas and served as LULAC's second president. As president of LULAC, he focused on the creation of 24 new councils across the South Texas. According to the LULAC News (LULAC's official newsletter), Perales helped to cement the organization's spirit: "LULAC is much indebted to the efforts and sacrifices put forth by these pioneers like Alonso S. Perales. It was this spirit of courage - tenacity and self-sacrifice - during the early history of LULAC that became known as the 'LULAC Spirit.'"

Among his efforts was also the 1930 defeat of House Resolution 6465, also known as the Box Bill, introduced by U.S. Representative John C. Box, which proposed expanding the Immigration Act of 1924 to include quotas on Mexican immigrants to the United States. Perales, together with his fellow LULACers, Canales and Garza, travelled to Washington D.C. to testify in US congressional hearings against the bill. The bill did not pass.

Honors and Memorials 
In 1977, the Edgewood Independent School District in San Antonio named the Alonso S. Perales Elementary School in his honor.

In 2011, the Perales family donated his archive to Arte Público Press and its historical arm, Recovering the US Hispanic Literary Heritage program. The collection includes correspondence, historic LULAC papers and publications, photographs, and rare manuscripts. It is housed at the University of Houston's MD Anderson Libraries Special Collections. Shortly after the donation, organization held a Recovering the US Hispanic Literary Heritage academic conference dedicated to the work of Perales. The edited collection of scholarly essays, In Defense of my people: Alonso S. Perales and the development of Mexican-American public intellectuals, edited by Michael A. Olivas, was a result of the scholarship presented at the conference.

Using the collection stated above, A digital humanities project which illustrates visually the spread of these correspondences, documents, pictures, and manuscripts related to Perales and his work as well as information directly related to LULAC. The project is titled The Alonso S. Perales Correspondence.

Works 

 En Defensa de mi raza, vol. I & II. (Artes Gráficas, 1937)
 Are We Good Neighbors? (Artes Gráficas, 1948)
 "La Evolución De La Raza Mexicana En Texas," La Prensa (San Antonio, TX), Sep. 13, 1927.

Further reading 

 Cynthia Orozco. Pioneer of Mexican American Civil Rights: Alonso S. Perales. (Arte Público Press, 2020).
 Michael A. Olivas (ed.), In Defense of My People : Alonso S. Perales and the Development of Mexican-American Public Intellectuals. (Arte Público Press, 2012).
 Adela Sloss-Vento, Alonso S. Perales: His Struggles for the Rights of Mexican Americans. (Austin, Texas: Artes Graficas, 1977).
 Amy Waters, Yarsinske. All For One, One For All: A Celebration of 75 Years of the League of United Latin American Citizens. (The Donning Company Publishers, 2004).

References

External links 
 Texas State Historical Association Handbook entry on Alonso S. Perales
 League of United Latin American Citizens (LULAC)

1898 births
1960 deaths
American civil rights lawyers
George Washington University Law School alumni
League of United Latin American Citizens activists